The common shrew opossums (genus Caenolestes) are members of the family Caenolestidae. They are found in Colombia, Ecuador, Peru, and Venezuela. The most recently discovered species is C. sangay.

References

Shrew opossums
Marsupials of South America
Marsupial genera
Neogene mammals of South America
Quaternary mammals of South America
Taxa named by Oldfield Thomas
Prehistory of Ecuador
Prehistory of Peru
Prehistory of Venezuela